Kubağ (former Kırbağ, also called Kurbağaköy) is a village in Gülnar district of  Mersin Province, Turkey. At  it is situated in Toros Mountains  and to the east of a tributary of Göksu River. The population of the village was 226  as of 2012.

References

Villages in Gülnar District